The fourth and final season of Beauty & the Beast (an American television series developed by Sherri Cooper-Landsman and Jennifer Levin and very loosely inspired by the 1987 CBS television series of the same name) consists of 13 episodes. It premiered in the United States on The CW on June 2, 2016.

Cast

Main
Kristin Kreuk as Catherine "Cat" Chandler
Jay Ryan as Vincent Keller
Austin Basis as J.T. Forbes
Nina Lisandrello as Tess Vargas
Nicole Gale Anderson as Heather Chandler
Michael Roark as Kyle Johnson

Recurring
Andrew Stewart-Jones as Deputy Secretary Hill
Melissa Tang as Grace Rose
Tahmoh Penikett as Kane
Anastasia Barzee as Special Agent Olivia Dylan
Dayo Ade as Dawes
Marc Singer as Peter Braxton

Production
On February 13, 2015, The CW renewed the series for a fourth season. On October 13, 2015, it was announced that the fourth season of Beauty & the Beast would be the final season. Filming began on May 29, 2015, and ended on November 17, 2015.

Casting
Max Brown, who starred as Dr. Evan Marks during the first season, is returning for a guest appearance in season four. TVLine reported that the show is adding another main character named Kyle, an EMT in his mid-20s.

Episodes

Reception

U.S. Nielsen ratings

References

Season
2016 American television seasons